Dring may refer to:

Clive Dring (born 1934), English cricketer
Edgar Dring (1896–1955), Australian politician
Sir John Dring (1902–1991), British colonial administrator, Prime Minister Bahawalpur
Lawrie Dring (1931–2012), British scouter
Lilian Dring (1908–1998), British artist
Madeleine Dring (1923–1977), English composer and actress
Rawlins Dring (fl.1688), English physician
Ray Dring (1924–2003), English professional footballer
Simon Dring (1945–2021), English journalist
Thomas Dring (died 1668), English publisher and bookseller
William Dring (1904–1990), English portrait painter

Other uses
Dring, County Cavan, a townland in the parish of Kildallan, County Cavan, Ireland